String Quintet No. 3 may refer to:

 String Quintet No. 3 (Dvořák)
 String Quintet No. 3 (Mozart)